Mykhail Semenko or Mykhailo Vasyliovich Semenko (31 December 1892 – 23 October 1937) was a Ukrainian poet, and a prominent representative of Ukrainian futurist poetry of the 1920s. He is considered to be one of the lead figures of the Executed Renaissance.

He was a founder of futurist groups Aspanfut, Komunkult, Nova Generatsiya, and Kverofuturism, better known in English as "Panfuturism". He was an editor in couple of almanacs and the journal "Nova generatsiya". As a poet Semenko wrote primarily for urban audiences. 

Semenko was an active participant of the movement that sought to break with the official Soviet cultural policy at the onset of the 20th century. His dissident art led him to establish avant-garde groups in Kyiv and Kharkiv. He established these futurist groups as an alternative to Russian Cubo-Futurism. Along with several Ukrainian intellectuals, he was arrested in 1937, sentenced to death and shot in Kyiv on October 23, 1937. In the 1957 he was rehabilitated.

References

Sources 
 Юрій Лавріненко. Розстріляне відродження: Антологія 1917–1933. — Київ: Смолоскип, 2004. 
 Encyclopedia of Ukraine. Semenko, Mykhailo

1892 births
1937 deaths
People from Poltava Oblast
Ukrainian male poets
20th-century Ukrainian poets
Ukrainian avant-garde
Ukrainian Futurism
Great Purge victims from Ukraine
Soviet rehabilitations
Soviet poets